Monika Rajiv Rajale is an Indian politician and a member of the 14th Maharashtra Legislative Assembly. she represents Shevgaon (Vidhan Sabha constituency) and She belongs to the Bharatiya Janata Party.

References

Maharashtra MLAs 2019–2024
Bharatiya Janata Party politicians from Maharashtra
Living people
Year of birth missing (living people)